Jean-Baptiste-Irénée Callot (1814-1875) was a French Roman Catholic priest. He served as the first Bishop of Oran in Oran, French Algeria from 1867 to 1875.

Early life
Jean-Baptiste-Irénée Callot was born on 23 November 1814 in Beaujeu, Rhône, France.

Vocation
Callot was a Professor of Theology at the University of Lyon.

Callot was appointed as the vicar of the Saint Irenaeus Church in Lyon in 1856. He served as the first Bishop of Oran in Oran, French Algeria from 1867 to 1875.

Death
Callot died on 1 November 1875 in Beaujeu, France.

References

1814 births
1875 deaths
Clergy from Lyon
Academic staff of the University of Lyon
French Roman Catholic bishops in Africa
Roman Catholic bishops of Oran